Bovbjerg is an up to 41 meter high coastal hill south  of the village Ferring in Western Jutland, Denmark. It is known for its lighthouse, Bovbjerg Fyr, and its beach, Bovbjerg Strand.

Bovbjerg is located in Lemvig Municipality, Region Midtjylland.

References

External links 

 Visit Denmark

Hills of Denmark
Lemvig Municipality